University station may refer to any of the following:

Canada
University station (Calgary), a light rail station serving the University of Calgary in Alberta
University station (Edmonton), a light rail station serving the University of Alberta in Alberta

Colombia
University station (Medellín), an urban train station serving the University of Antioquia, in Medellín

Germany
 Universität station (Munich U-Bahn), a subway station in Munich, Germany
 Universität/Markt station, a rapid transit station in Bonn, Germany

Greece
Panepistimio metro station (Athens), a subway station serving the National and Kapodistrian University of Athens
Panepistimio metro station (Thessaloniki), an under-construction subway station serving the Aristotle University of Thessaloniki and also the University of Macedonia

Hong Kong
University station (MTR), a railway station serving the Chinese University of Hong Kong, in Sha Tin District, New Territories
HKU station, a subway station serving the University of Hong Kong, in the Central and Western District, Hong Kong

Indonesia
Universitas Indonesia railway station, a station serving the University of Indonesia, Greater Jakarta, in Depok, West Java

Malaysia
Universiti LRT station, a light rail station serving the University of Malaya, in Kuala Lumpur

Mexico
Metro Universidad, a station on the Mexico City Metro
Universidad (Monterrey Metro), a subway station serving the Autonomous University of Nuevo León, in San Nicolás de los Garza, Nuevo León

Russia
Universitet (Moscow Metro), serving Moscow State University, in Moscow

Sweden
Universitetet railway station, serving Stockholm University, in Stockholm
Universitetet metro station, serving Stockholm University, in Stockholm

Ukraine
Universytet (Kharkiv Metro), serving Kharkiv National University, in Kharkiv
Universytet (Kyiv Metro), serving Taras Shevchenko National University, in Kyiv

United Kingdom
University railway station (England), serving the University of Birmingham, in Birmingham, England
University railway station (Northern Ireland), serving the University of Ulster at Coleraine, in Coleraine, Northern Ireland
University Metro station, a station on the Tyne and Wear Metro, serving the University of Sunderland

United States
University Station, the branding of the condominium complex in the Produce Terminal Cold Storage Company Building, in Chicago, Illinois
University station (Los Angeles Metro), a light rail station (now renamed Expo Park/USC station) serving the University of Southern California, in Los Angeles, California
University station (Arrow), a planned commuter rail station serving the University of Redlands, in Redlands, California
University station (Miami-Dade County), a rapid transit station serving the University of Miami, in Coral Gables, Florida
University station (CTA), a former L station serving the University of Chicago, in Chicago, Illinois
University station (Buffalo Metro Rail), a light metro station serving the University at Buffalo, in Buffalo, New York
University Park station in University Park, Illinois 
Penn Medicine station, a commuter rail station in Philadelphia, Pennsylvania, formerly called University City station

See also
College Station (disambiguation)
College Park station (disambiguation)
Metro Universidad (disambiguation)
University (disambiguation)